Mioko Yamaguchi (Japanese: 山口美央子) is a Japanese singer-songwriter and composer of popular music. 

Yamaguchi's music career began on F-Label, where she released a trilogy of albums where she sang and played keyboards. She also composed most of her own songs. After the album Tsukihime (Japanese: 月姫; Moonlight Princess) in 1983, she changed her focus to providing music to others. Yamaguchi has composed songs for artists such as Yuki Saito and Yukari Tamura. In addition, she has composed music for anime, including Ranma 1/2 and Pokonyan!. She has composed over 400 songs overall.

After over 30 years, Yamaguchi began releasing new music herself, beginning with Tokisakashima (Japanese: トキサカシマ) in late 2018. She also reissued her original albums on CD for the first time.

Discography 
Studio albums
 夢飛行 (1980)
 Nirvana (1981)
 月姫 (1983)
 トキサカシマ (2018)
 Floma (2019)
 フェアリズム (2022)
Compilation
 Anju (1985)
EP
 Floma Mini (2020)

References

External links 
 Official website
 Twitter
 Facebook

Japanese singer-songwriters
21st-century Japanese women singers
21st-century Japanese singers
Living people
Year of birth missing (living people)
20th-century Japanese women singers
20th-century Japanese singers
Japanese composers
Anime composers